FWP may refer to:

 Federal Writers' Project
 Fort Wayne Pistons
 Freshwater Place
 Montana Department of Fish, Wildlife and Parks
 First World Problem/s
 "F.W.P." (Fuck White People), a song by AJJ from Candy Cigarettes & Cap Guns